Fred, Frederic or Frederick Chapman may refer to:

 Frederic Chapman (1823–1895), English publisher with Chapman & Hall
 Frederick Chapman (British Army officer) (1815–1893), British Army officer and colonial official 
 Frederick Chapman (palaeontologist) (1864–1943), English-born Australian palaeontologist
 Frederick Chapman (footballer) (1883–1951), English soccer player, 1908 Olympic gold medallist 
Fred Chapman (baseball) (1916–1997), American baseball player
 Frederick Chapman (sportsman) (1901–1964), Australian cricketer and Australian rules footballer
 Frederick Chapman (judge) (1849–1936), New Zealand judge
 Freddie Spencer Chapman (1907–1971), British Army officer
 Frederick William Chapman  (1806–1876), American minister and genealogist

See also
Frederick Chapman Robbins (1916–2003), American doctor